Leka may refer to:

People

As a personal name
 Leka, Crown Prince of Albania (born 1939) (1939–2011), also known as King Leka I, son of Zog I of Albania
 Leka, Crown Prince of Albania (born 1982), also known as King Leka II, grandson of Zog I of Albania and son of Leka I
 Leka, 11th century Paulician leader
 Leca of Cătun, 17th century military commander
 Lekë Dukagjini, 15th century aristocrat, leader of the League of Lezhë
 Lekë Matrënga, 17th century writer
 Lekë Zaharia, 15th century aristocrat
 Lekë Dushmani, 15th century aristocrat

As a surname
 Lecca in Romania and Moldova.
 Lekkas/Lekka (fem.) in Greece.
 Donald Leka, an entrepreneur in the information technology industry and pioneer in the cloud computing space
 Paul Leka (1943–2011), an American songwriter, record producer, and musician

Places
 Léka, a castle of the kingdom of Hungary
 Leka, Ethiopia, a town in Ethiopia
 Leka, Norway, a municipality in Trøndelag county, Norway
 Leka (island), an island in Trøndelag county, Norway
 Léka, a town in the district of Oberpullendorf in the state of Burgenland in Austria

See also
 Łęka (disambiguation), name of a number of places in Poland